Steeves Mountain is a Canadian Community, located in Westmorland County, New Brunswick. The Community is situated in southeastern New Brunswick, to the west of Moncton. Steeves Mountain is part of Greater Moncton.

History

Notable people

Bordering communities
Boundary Creek, New Brunswick
Gallagher Ridge, New Brunswick
Berry Mills, New Brunswick
Moncton, New Brunswick
Second North River, New Brunswick

See also
List of communities in New Brunswick

References

Communities in Westmorland County, New Brunswick
Communities in Greater Moncton